Lady Hester Pulter (née Ley) (1605–1678) was a seventeenth-century poet and writer, whose manuscript was rediscovered in 1996 in the Brotherton Library, University of Leeds. Her major works include "Poems Breathed Forth By the Noble Hadassas", "The Sighes of a Sad Soule Emblematically Breath'd Forth by the Noble Hadassas", and "The Unfortunate Florinda."

Life

Birth 
An inscription in Hester's manuscript—"Made when my spirits were sunk very low with sickness and sorrow. may 1667. I being seventy one years old" (fol. 88v)—suggests that she was born in 1595; however, given the title of her poem "Universall dissolution, made when I was with Child of my 15th Child \my sonne John/ I being as every one thought in a Consumption 1648" (fol. 10v), a birth year of 1595 would have made her fifty-three years old at the birth of her youngest child. Another alternative piece of evidence is given in Hester's manuscript when she mourns the Irish Rebellion, writing that she remembers "sweete Hibernie where I first had life" (fol. 12v). Her family lived in Ireland from December 1604 to October 1608, due to her father taking up the position of Chief Justice of the King's Bench in Ireland. This suggests Hester was born in or around Dublin during this time. Another poem, titled "Made when I was sick 1647", provides further confirmation of this alternative date, when Hester laments her "forty years acquaintance" with her body. This would place her birth year at 1607.

However, an alternate piece of evidence is found in a manuscript titled "The Declaracion of Ley, or Ley: His Pedigree" (Wiltshire and Swindon History Centre, 366/1). As Alice Eardley observed, the manuscript provides a specific date for Hester's birth and baptism:

Hester, the daughter of the said Sir James Ley and the Lady Mary, his wief, was borne at St. Thomas Court, neere Dublin, in the realme of Ireland, uppon Saturdaie beinge the [viii]th daie of June in the yeare of the raigne of King James of England and Ireland the third, and of Scotland the xxxviiith Anno dmi. 1605, betwene the houres of six and seven of the clock in the morninge, and was baptised in the parish church of St. Katherins in Thomas Streete, neare Dublin, uppon Sondaie beinge the [xix] daie of June then next followinge.

Although the manuscript states that Hester was born on 8 June 1605, Eardley notes that it was 18 June that fell on a Saturday that year, and it seems probable that Hester was born then and baptized the following day: "This gives us the 18 June 1605 as Pulter’s date of birth."

Background

Hester was the daughter of James Ley, who became the first Earl of Marlborough in 1626, and Mary, James Ley's first wife. Hester was one of eleven children. It is speculated that the family had a strong connection to John Milton through his Sonnet 10 which addresses Hester's sister, Margaret Ley, to a small degree, while focusing on James Ley, "that good Earl." In 1623, supposedly at the age of thirteen, Hester married Arthur Pulter, and proceeded to spend the rest of her life confined to Broadfield Hall, near Cottered in Hertfordshire. (See image here) The Pulters' had fifteen children, seven sons and eight daughters, only two of whom outlived their mother. During the English Civil Wars, the Pulters withdrew from public life, as a way for Arthur to remain politically neutral. Hester did not remain quiet like her husband, and began writing politically based poetry during the 1640s and the 1650s. Hester Pulter died in 1678; the exact date is unknown. She was buried on 9 April 1678. Her husband outlived both Hester and their children, dying on 27 January 1689. They were survived by their only grandson, James Forester, and he became the sole heir.

Career 
Until the discovery of the Leeds Manuscript found in 1996, Lady Hester Pulter was an unknown contributor to British literature. The only claim to fame that the Pulters previously had was a place in Sir Henry Chauncy's history of Hertfordshire. The connection between her sister, Margaret, and the London literary world through Milton might have been a way for Pulter to keep up with the newest literature, which shows in her own poetry.

Pulter's writings are mostly political bits about the English Civil Wars, from a "royalist" standpoint. The goal of Charles I was to defend the established church and state of England. Under the pen name Hadassas, Lady Hester Pulter began writing 130 folios of poetry and 30 folios of an unfinished prose manuscript. A majority of her poems were about the death of King Charles the I, in which she condemned his killers and praised the dead monarch. The name Hadassas comes from the biblical reference to Esther.

Literary works 

In the mid-1990s, Mark Robson discovered "Poems breathed forth by the Noble Hadrassas", a previously unknown set of poems by Pulter, and "The Unfortunate Florinda" in the Leeds University Brotherton Library. The Leeds manuscript includes about 130 folios of poems and 30 folios of an unfinished manuscript of a prose romance named "The Unfortunate Florinda." (See image here) It was likely written during the 1640s-1650s, and copied in the mid 1650s. The manuscript demonstrates Hester's knowledge in writing and astronomy, as well as her extreme Royalism. Unlike her husband, Hester was not silent, nor cautious about taking sides. Her poems showed her outrage toward the murder of King Charles I.

"Poems breathed forth by the Noble Hadassas" and "The Sighes of a Sad Soule Emblematically Breath'd Forth By the Noble Hadassas" 
(See image here)

The first ninety or so poems made up the section titled Poems breathed forth, as well as a smaller sub-section titled Hadassas Chast Fances. The second section, consisting of forty or so poems, is titled The Sighes of a Sad Soule Emblematically Breath'd Forth. These poems are of the lyrical and occasional verse. The first four poems show the diversity of Lady Pulter's poetry: national politics, pastoral, spiritual astronomy, and light and dark mythology. A distinct characteristic of Lady Pulter' s poetry is her ability to mix personal, political, and planetary themes. One example of this is the section consisting of the literary works Of Night and Morning, Universall dissolution, and the series of poems following afterwards in which personal and national grief mixes. For Lady Pulter, political concerns and personal life were not separate. This is shown in how two poems about the death of her daughter are preceded by poems lamenting the death of other Royalists. With the mixing of the themes within "Poems breathed forth," it seems as if Lady Pulter would have her audience think that the losses of her children, as well as those of the Royalists, are connected through the destruction of the earth that resulted from the English Civil War.

"The Unfortunate Florinda" 

The last section of the Leeds manuscript was titled The Unfortunate Florinda. A prose romance, it was left unfinished and was transcribed between March and December 1661. It seemed to be written after Poems breathed forth by the Noble Hadrassas. Furthermore, the romance seems to have been a second thought, even though in the same script as the original manuscript. The volume was reversed and it began from the back. The apparent lack of preparations could mean that Hester didn't consider The Unfortunate Florinda to be equal to Poems Breathed Forth By the Noble Hadrassas.

According to scholar Peter C. Herman, in the poem Pulter "adapts the historical legends of how King Roderigo's raping the daughter of Count Julian led to the Islamic conquest of Spain to express her dismay at the sexual corruption of King Charles II's court". Pulter's reconsideration of political views she had previously held led her to "challenge the primacy of Christianity by giving a sympathetic portrait of pagan belief; the dominant view of sexual violence by endorsing the Augustinian view of rape as blaming the rapist, not his victim; and conventional views of race by depicting the African women as fair while contrasting their virtue with the sexually corrupt West, Spain in particular".

Plot summary 
The story takes place in Spain, when King Roderigo has taken over the throne. A group of African noblewomen, who were on a pleasure trip, are shipwrecked on the Spanish coast. Roderigo falls in love with the Moorish princess Zabra, and marries her after she converts to Christianity. However, Roderigo then lusts after Florinda, the daughter of a Spanish courtier and diplomat. Using his friend, Alphonso, Roderigo pursues Florinda. However, Florinda rejects him, causing Roderigo to hate her.

The plots take a break from the main storyline to focus on Fidelia, Zabra's companion who was in Africa all this time, who arrives unexpectedly and tells her own story of adventure. In it, another African king, whom Pulter does not name, demanded Fidelia as his mistress on pain of death. Fidelia and her lover, Amandus, who is the Prince of Naples, kill the African king through a trick in bed. They escape, but are captured by pirates and separated.

In the main storyline, Roderigo rapes Florinda and threatens her with terrible things should she tell anyone else what occurred. Florinda, promising revenge, tells her father of the rape, and he joins in her search for revenge. The entire family, after learning what happened, are outraged by King Roderigo's actions. They all proceed to travel to Africa and ask King Almanzar to invade Spain, deeming regicide as an appropriate punishment for rape. Almanzar agrees to invade Spain, and the manuscript ends here.

Astronomy in Pulter's works

Astronomy as a means for spiritual reflection 
Astronomical discoveries of the seventeenth century were embraced through many facets in Hester Pulter's poetry. Poems such as "Universal Dissolution", "The Revolution", "A Solitary Complaint", and "Why Must I Thus Forever Be Confined" are examples of Pulter's literary work that express an interest in astronomical imagery. Tamara Mahadin points out that Pulter embraced Copernican cosmology, as seen in the beginning of her poem "A Solitary Complaint" with the lines, "Whenas those vast and glorious globes above/ Eternally in treble motions move." The phrase "treble motions" reaffirms the Copernican theory of the planets revolving around the sun due to the new heliotropic center of the universe. Mahadin describes Pulter's use of the cosmos as a means for comfort since this interest offered an escape from the many pains she endured. Pulter's knowledge of recent astronomical discoveries acted as an opportunity for spiritual reflection within her domestic life. She examined the planets as significant to life on Earth, embracing them as non separate. Pulter's poem "A Solitary Complaint" examines the sadness she felt in relation with the planetary system, "Must I still be confined to this sad grove."

The escape the Pulter yearns for can be found in many of her poems such as "Why Must I Thus Forever Be Confined," where she imagines her own death to cause the dispersal of her atoms around the universe to be used in the creation of a new world. The final lines, "Until, by other atoms thrust and hurled/ We give a being to another world," suggest this insight. A similar message is found in Pulter's "The Revolution." Leah Knight and Wendy Hall explain that Pulter's allure with the reuse of her physical body in the heavens is present in this poem, proving an embrace of cosmology. Pulter was fascinated with the purification of ancient life forms through disintegration into a final unknown form. The disintegration is a vehicle for exhilaration for a Pulter who imagined her thoughts to travel from a confined body, due to childbearing or illness, to an intricately detailed universe.

Motifs in Pulter's works

Circle motif in Pulter's work 
Circles and circle imagery appear numerous times within Pulter's works. Some examples of the circle motif show up in the poems, "The Circle", "The Welcome", "The Eclipse", and "Upon the Death of my Dear and Lovely Daughter Jane Pulter". However, Elizabeth Scott-Baumann observed that the word circle is missing throughout the set of "The Circle" poems, except within the titles and once in "The Circle [1]", making the meaning behind the imagery possibly ambiguous to the reader. The circle motif appears in various poems sparking from Pulter's interest in the theological, alchemical, and astronomical spheres of the world. The theme of repetition and returning to one's beginning or to a feeling is present in Pulter's work.

Circles in a theological sense 
Leah Knight and Wendy Wall describe Pulter's theological poems as fixated on eschatology, a theology which focuses on death, the end times, and what happens after. Pulter believed that in her death, her soul would return to the heavens, indicating that life works in a circular motion. Elizabeth Kolkovich notes that this was a source of comfort for Pulter as seen in "The Circle [1]" with the line "No grief shall so emergent be/ To separate my soul from Thee". This line expresses Pulter's feeling that although she will die, she will feel no grief as her soul is returning to God. The circle motif is found within Pulter's views on the cycle of life and death, within the circular motion of returning to the dust God created life from.

A similar sentiment is expressed in "The Circle [2]" with the line "Forgetting quite that they were once refined/ By time and fate to dust are all calcined". Pulter ridicules the goal of alchemists who tried to find a cure for death as impractical due to the circular nature of life she believed in. While also referring to the alchemical cycle of calcination, Jayne Archer explains that these alchemical references can also be read as metaphor in a religious aspect. The circle motif is found again with the parallel of the process of calcination turning the silver and gold into dust with the process of death and the human body eventually turning to dust, in which dust has the context of the same material God is said to have created mankind from, thus returning once more to the state of origin.

However, within "Upon the Death of my Dear and Lovely Daughter Jane Pulter", Kolkovich observes that this poem expresses Pulter's struggle to find the comfort she had in her faith that death reunites the soul with God and is trapped within the cycle of grief. While Pulter has the belief that Jane is reunited with God, her grief is something she cannot move past and finds herself continuously coming back to despite how many years it has been. Her repeated feelings reflect the same circular nature of life. The circle motif is found within Pulter's faith, but also reconciled with the expression that while she remains on Earth, she will be in the cycle of grief which only death can break her from.

References

Bibliography 
 
 
 
 
 "Milton: Sonnet 10 - Notes". www.dartmouth.edu. Retrieved 2016-04-20.

Further reading 
 Lady Hester Pulter: A Digital Companion
 Pulter, Lady Hester (2014), Eardley, Alice, ed., Poems, Emblems, and the Unfortunate Florinda, Toronto: Centre for Reformation and Renaissance Studies, .
 https://library.leeds.ac.uk/special-collections-explore/7610
 http://orlando.cambridge.org/public/svPeople?person_id=pulthe
 https://episteme.revues.org/729
 The Pulter Project: Poet in the Making
 Dunn, Rachel. "Breaking a Tradition: Hester Pulter and the English Emblem Book." The Seventeenth Century 30, no. 1 (2015): 55–73.
 Eardley, A. "[null Hester Pulter's 'Indivisibles' and the Challenges of Annotating Early Modern Women's Poetry]." SEL: Studies in English Literature 1500–1900 2012 Winter 52, no. 1: 117–141. MLA International Biography.
 Robson, M. "Swansongs: Reading Voice in the Poetry of Lady Hester Pulter." English Manuscript Studies 1100-1700 Vol. 9 (2000): 238–256. MLA International Biography.

1605 births
1678 deaths
English women poets
17th-century English women writers
17th-century English writers
Daughters of British earls